La Belle may be a place in the US:

 LaBelle, Florida
 La Belle, Missouri
 La Belle, Texas
 La Belle Township, South Dakota

La Belle may also be:

 La Belle (discotheque)
 La Belle (ship)
 La Belle Verte (1996)
 James D. La Belle, U.S. Marine Hero
 La Belle, a 2000 Korean movie starring Oh Ji-ho

See also
La Belle discotheque bombing 1986
Labelle (disambiguation)